Tubulophilinopsis is a genus of medium-sized, sea slugs from the Indo-West Pacific belonging to the family Aglajidae.

Species
As of 2021 there are four species:

References

External links
 Zamora-Silva A. & Malaquias M.A.E. (2018 (nomenclatural availability: 2017). Molecular phylogeny of the Aglajidae head-shield sea slugs (Heterobranchia: Cephalaspidea): new evolutionary lineages revealed and proposal of a new classification. Zoological Journal of the Linnean Society. 183(1): 1-51.

Molluscs of the Indian Ocean
Molluscs of the Pacific Ocean
Aglajidae